Francis John Shugars (22 September 1875 – 16 June 1953) was a Welsh rugby union, and professional rugby league footballer who played in the 1900s and 1910s. He played club level rugby union (RU) for Penygraig RFC, and representative level rugby league (RL) for Great Britain, Wales and Lancashire, and at club level for Warrington (Heritage No. 122), as a forward (prior to the specialist positions of), during the era of contested scrums.

Background
Frank Shugars was born in Pontypridd, Wales, and he died aged 77 in Warrington, Lancashire, England.

Playing career

International honours
Frank Shugars won five caps for Wales (RL) while at Warrington between 1909 and 1912, all of them against England.

Shugars became Warrington's first player to become a Great Britain tourist when was selected to go on the 1910 Great Britain Lions tour of Australia and New Zealand, and won caps for Great Britain against Australasia and New Zealand.

Challenge Cup Final appearances
Frank Shugars played as a forward, i.e. number 10, in Warrington's 6–0 victory over Hull Kingston Rovers in the 1905 Challenge Cup Final during the 1904–05 season at Headingley Rugby Stadium, Leeds on 29 April 1905, in front of a crowd of 19,638, and played as a forward, i.e. number 11, in the 17–3 victory over Oldham in the 1906–07 Challenge Cup Final during the 1906–07 season at Wheater's Field, Broughton, Salford on Saturday Saturday 27 April 1907, in front of a crowd of 18,500.

Club career
Frank Shugars made his début for Warrington on Saturday 3 September 1904, and he played his last match for Warrington on Wednesday 27 March 1912.

Honoured at Warrington Wolves
Frank Shugars is a Warrington Wolves Hall of Fame inductee.

References

External links
!Great Britain Statistics at englandrl.co.uk (statistics currently missing due to not having appeared for both Great Britain, and England)
Statistics at wolvesplayers.thisiswarrington.co.uk 

1875 births
1953 deaths
Footballers who switched code
Great Britain national rugby league team players
Lancashire rugby league team players
Penygraig RFC players
Rugby league forwards
Rugby league players from Pontypridd
Wales national rugby league team players
Warrington Wolves players
Welsh rugby league players
Welsh rugby union players
Rugby union players from Pontypridd